is a Japanese pair skater. With his skating partner, Riku Miura, she is the 2022 World silver medalist, the 2023 Four Continents champion, the 2022–23 Grand Prix Final champion, a two-time ISU Grand Prix gold medalist, the 2021 CS Autumn Classic champion, and the 2020 Japanese national champion. They also are bronze medalists in the team event at the 2022 Winter Olympics.

He previously competed with Narumi Takahashi and Miu Suzaki, representing Japan at the 2014 and 2018 Winter Olympics, respectively.

As a singles skater, he is a two-time bronze medalist on the ISU Junior Grand Prix series and the 2010–11 Japanese Junior silver medalist.

Personal life 
Kihara was born in Ichinomiya, Aichi.

He enjoys playing baseball in his spare time.

Career

Single skating 
Kihara began learning to skate in 1996. He finished 10th at the 2011 World Junior Championships. He competed in singles through January 28, 2013.

Partnership with Takahashi 
On January 30, 2013, the Japanese skating federation confirmed that Kihara would compete in pair skating with Narumi Takahashi, the 2012 World bronze medalist, and they would be coached by Yuka Sato and Jason Dungjen. They trained in Bloomfield Hills, Michigan. They represented Japan together at the 2014 Olympics and placed 19th.

The pair split in March 2015.

2016–2017 season: Debut of Suzaki/Kihara 
In June 2015, Japanese media reported that Kihara had teamed up with former single skater Miu Suzaki, with whom he would continue to train in Michigan. In December, they received the bronze medal at the Japan Championships. They did not appear internationally in their first season together.

2016–2017 season 
After winning their first international medal (bronze) at the Asian Open Trophy in early August 2016 in Manila, Suzaki/Kihara took silver at the Japan Championships in December. Ranked twelfth in the short program and fourteenth in the free skate, they finished thirteenth overall at the 2017 Four Continents Championships, held in February in Gangneung, South Korea.

2017–2018 season: Pyeongchang Olympics 
Suzaki/Kihara began their season with silver at the Asian Open Trophy in August 2017. Making their Grand Prix debut, they finished eighth at the 2017 NHK Trophy in November.  They won their first national title at the 2017–18 Japan Championships and were assigned to Japan's lone pairs spot at the 2018 Winter Olympics in PyeongChang. In February, they competed at the Olympics in both the team event and the individual event. They placed 21st in the latter and missed the free skate. They concluded their season at the 2018 World Championships, where they placed 24th, again missing the free skate.

2018–2019 season: End of Suzaki/Kihara 
In October 2018, Suzaki/Kihara placed tenth at the 2018 CS Finlandia Trophy. They placed eighth at the 2018 Grand Prix Helsinki, their first Grand Prix event of the season. They also placed eighth at the 2018 NHK Trophy, their second assignment. They won a second national title at the 2018–19 Japan Championships. Due to a concussion sustained by Kihara in training, the pair withdrew from the 2019 Four Continents Championships and the home 2019 World Championships in Saitama. They announced the end of their partnership in early April 2019.

2019–2020 season: Debut of Miura/Kihara
In August 2019, it was announced that Kihara had teamed up with Riku Miura and that the pair would train in Oakville, Ontario at the Skate Oakville Skating Club under Bruno Marcotte, Meagan Duhamel, and Brian Shales.

Miura/Kihara made their international competitive debut at 2019 NHK Trophy, where they finished fifth.  They were the only pair competing at the 2019–20 Japan Championships and had two falls in the short program.  The free skate proved more successful, allowing them to claim the Japanese national title and assignments to the ISU championships in the second half of the season.

After an eighth-place finish at the 2020 Four Continents Championships, Miura/Kihara were assigned to compete at the World Championships in Montreal, but these were cancelled as a result of the coronavirus pandemic.

2020–2021 season
Miura/Kihara was assigned to compete at the 2020 Skate Canada International, but this event was cancelled due to the pandemic.  Making their season and Worlds debut at the 2021 World Championships in Stockholm, they placed tenth. As Japan's only pair, they were named to the team for the 2021 World Team Trophy. On April 8, he was named team captain.  They finished third in both segments, helping Team Japan to the bronze medal.

2021–2022 season: Beijing Olympics and World silver
Miura/Kihara spent the period after the World Team Trophy training in Japan and the United States before returning to Canada in September upon the reopening of the borders. They began their season at the 2021 CS Autumn Classic International, where they won both segments of competition and set new personal bests to take the gold medal overall.

At their first Grand Prix assignment of the season, the 2021 Skate America, Miura/Kihara again scored new personal bests in both segments of competition, as well as overall. Despite placing third in both the short program and the free skate, due to shifting ordinals from their competitors, the team won the silver medal between Russian competitors Tarasova/Morozov in first and Boikova/Kozlovskii in third. Their medal marks the first medal for Japan in the pairs event on the Grand Prix circuit since 2011. Competing at the 2021 NHK Trophy at home for their second event, they were third in both programs to take the bronze medal. They finished less than four points behind silver medalists Tarasova/Morozov, a gap more than accounted for by jump and throw errors by Miura. She noted training issues and expressed dissatisfaction that she had been unable to fix the problem but that they were nevertheless satisfied to have achieved their goal of winning a medal. Miura/Kihara's results qualified them to the Grand Prix Final, but it was subsequently cancelled due to restrictions prompted by the Omicron variant.

Due to the Omicron variant, Miura/Kihara did not travel to Japan to participate in the 2021–22 Japan Championships but were instead named directly to the Japanese Olympic team. They began the 2022 Winter Olympics as the Japanese entries in the Olympic team event. They placed fourth in the short program, securing seven points for the Japanese team. Skating the free segment as well, they finished in second place there, taking nine points for the Japanese team, which went on to win the bronze medal. This was the first time that Japan had taken a medal in the team event, and Miura/Kihara's presence as a strong pair team was widely cited as the biggest factor in Japan's increased competitiveness. In the pairs event, Miura doubled her triple jump attempt in the short program, as a result of which they placed eighth in the segment. In the free skate, they finished fifth in the segment, rising to seventh place overall.

Days after the Olympics concluded, Vladimir Putin ordered an invasion of Ukraine, as a result of which the International Skating Union banned all Russian and Belarusian skaters from competing at the 2022 World Championships. As well, the Chinese Skating Association opted not to send athletes to compete in Montpellier. As those countries' athletes comprised the entirety of the top five pairs at the Olympics, this hugely impacted the field, and Miura/Kihara entered as medal favourites. In the short program, Miura put a hand down after stepping out on their throw triple Lutz, but they finished third in the segment, taking a bronze small medal. They had a rough free skate, with errors on both jumping passes and Miura falling on a throw triple loop. They also finished third in that segment but took the silver medal overall. They became the second Japanese pair team to win a World medal. Miura opined afterward, "now we secure the medal, but I don't think our performance was worth winning a medal today. We regret our performance today, so next season I want to push ourselves hard and to the very end, and we want to practice hard." Their coach, Bruno Marcotte, countered that "I told them to look at their silver medals and think: 'This is the result of all the work you did, all the competitions, the year and a half that you had to stay in Canada, away from your families, because of COVID-19. These medals represent all of that.'"

2022–2023 season: Grand Prix Final & Four Continents champions
In July, Miura injured her left shoulder while skating in a Japanese ice show during the off-season, which kept the pair from significant training until September. Despite this, Miura/Kihara managed to win gold at their first Grand Prix event, the 2022 Skate Canada International, becoming the first Japanese pair team ever to do so. Their free skate program earned praise from Sleeping at Last, the artist of the program's music. Weeks later, they competed at their second assignment, the 2022 NHK Trophy in Sapporo, winning the short program with a new personal best score, nearly 14 points clear of Americans Chan/Howe in second. They won the free skate by a wide margin, with only two minor errors, winning their second Grand Prix gold and becoming the first Japanese team to win Japan's home Grand Prix event. These results qualified them for the Grand Prix Final.

Miura/Kihara entered the Final in Turin as the top-seeded team and won the short program over American reigning World champions Knierim/Frazier by a 0.43 point margin, with the latter team having a jump error. They won the free skate by a similarly narrow 0.87 point margin after Miura doubled an intended triple toe loop and Kihara put his hand down on their triple Salchow. Kihara lamented the latter mistake, saying it was "the first time in eight years" that he had done so. He added that "we were saved by the power of the audience." They were the first Japanese pair to both medal at and win the Grand Prix Final.

Miura/Kihara were next scheduled to compete at the 2022–23 Japan Championships, but their travel from Canada to Japan was disrupted by the onset of a major winter storm, which resulted in their luggage being lost. Because of their lost skates, they were unable to compete at the championship, though the federation said they would still be considered for international assignments in the second half of the season.

With principal rivals Knierim/Frazier not attending the 2023 Four Continents Championships in favour of Art on Ice shows, Miura/Kihara entered the event as heavy favourites for the gold medal. Miura fell on a downgraded triple toe jump attempt in the short program, but the team still won that segment by a margin of 2.80 points over Canadians Stellato/Deschamps. Miura attributed the mistake to nervousness, but said she was pleased that even with the error they had scored over 70 points. Miura/Kihara won the free skate as well, albeit narrowly over Chan/Howe, with some jump errors and Kihara visibly struggling with low oxygen levels due to the high mountain location in Colorado Springs. They won the gold medal, another first for a Japanese pair.

Programs

With Miura

With Suzaki

With Takahashi

Single skating

Competitive highlights 
GP: Grand Prix; CS: Challenger Series; JGP: Junior Grand Prix

Pairs with Miura

Pairs with Suzaki

Pairs with Takahashi

Single skating

Detailed results

With Miura

References

External links 

 
 
 
 

1992 births
Japanese male single skaters
Japanese male pair skaters
Living people
People from Ichinomiya, Aichi
Figure skaters at the 2014 Winter Olympics
Figure skaters at the 2018 Winter Olympics
Figure skaters at the 2022 Winter Olympics
Olympic figure skaters of Japan
Olympic bronze medalists for Japan
Medalists at the 2022 Winter Olympics
Olympic medalists in figure skating
Figure skaters at the 2017 Asian Winter Games
Asian Games competitors for Japan
Japanese expatriate sportspeople in Canada
World Figure Skating Championships medalists
Four Continents Figure Skating Championships medalists